Football is by far the most popular sport in Chad. Many of top Chadian footballers have played professionally in France. According to one source, Nambatingue Tokomon, known as "Toko", played for renowned French soccer clubs, including Paris St. Germain, in the 1970s and 1980s. Abdoulay Karateka also played for Paris St. Germain. Ndoram Japhet played for Nantes and Monaco in the 1990s. The national team represents football in Chad internationally, however, the squad has never qualified for the FIFA World Cup or the African Cup of Nations. They did not enter qualification tournaments for the World Cup until 2002.

Chad stadiums

References